Andrew Ellis (born 21 February 1984) is a New Zealand rugby union player who plays the position of scrum-half for Rugby New York in Major League Rugby (MLR).

He previously played for the Kobelco Steelers in Japan, the Crusaders in Super Rugby and Canterbury in provincial rugby.

Career
In 2005 Ellis played in the New Zealand under-21 side. His Super 14 rookie year saw him oust All Black Kevin Senio from the Crusaders starting line-up. Ellis missed the 2006 Super 14 Final after sustaining a knee injury in the semi-final against the Bulls.

Although injury meant Ellis was unavailable for the 2006 All Blacks tests against Ireland and Argentina, he was later named to make his All Black debut against England at Twickenham. For the 2007 Rugby World Cup Ellis was selected ahead of Wellington halfback Piri Weepu.

After the 2011 Rugby World Cup Ellis wasn't selected for the All Blacks Squad again until 2015 against Samoa in Apia, as Tawera Kerr-Barlow was out for the 2015 Super Rugby season and both Aaron Smith and TJ Perenara had played in the 2015 Super Rugby Final.

Personal life
Ellis attended Burnside High School from 1997 to 2001.

He is the eldest of three children to Sue and Greg Ellis. He has two siblings: Amanda and Simon.

Ellis married his wife, Emma Bainbridge, in 2007, after a seven-year relationship. In December 2009 they had a daughter, Scarlett.

In 2018 Ellis helped launch Gravity satellite internet for rural New Zealanders with no traditional access to broadband.

References

External links
 

1984 births
Living people
New Zealand international rugby union players
New Zealand rugby union players
Rugby union scrum-halves
Canterbury rugby union players
Crusaders (rugby union) players
Rugby union players from Christchurch
People educated at Burnside High School
New Zealand expatriate rugby union players
New Zealand expatriate sportspeople in Japan
Expatriate rugby union players in Japan
Kobelco Kobe Steelers players
Barbarian F.C. players
Rugby New York players